The Everglow EP is an EP by Virginia alternative/indie band Mae. This album has been released on Tooth & Nail Records as an exclusive download available through online music stores on November 21, 2006. This EP includes the three additional songs that were included on The Everglow: Special Edition that were not on The Everglow.

Track listing
 "Where the Fall Begins" – 3:42
 "A Day In the Life" - 4:42
 "Suspension (Demo)" – 3:49

References                 

Mae albums
2006 EPs
Tooth & Nail Records EPs